The 2023 AFC Asian Cup qualification was the qualification process organized by the Asian Football Confederation (AFC) to determine the participating teams for the 2023 AFC Asian Cup, the 18th edition of the international men's football championship of Asia. Since 2019, the Asian Cup final tournament is contested by 24 teams, having been expanded from the 16-team format that was used from 2004 to 2015.

The qualification process involved four rounds, where the first two rounds doubled as the 2022 FIFA World Cup qualification for Asian teams. Only the first round acted as qualifiers for the cancelled 2020 AFC Solidarity Cup as the six teams which were eliminated from the first round of the 2022 World Cup and 2023 Asian Cup joint qualifiers. The two teams that were eliminated from the play-off round of the Asian Cup qualifiers were among the four teams that would have qualified for the Solidarity Cup.

Format
The qualification structure is as follows:
First round: 12 teams (ranked 35–46) played home-and-away over two legs. The six winners advanced to the second round.
Second round: 40 teams (ranked 1–34 and six first round winners) were divided into eight groups of five teams to play home-and-away round-robin matches. 
The eight group winners and the five best group runners-up, including former host China, qualified for the AFC Asian Cup.
The next 22 highest ranked teams (the remaining three group runners-up, the eight third-placed teams, the eight fourth-placed teams and the three best groups fifth-placed teams) advanced directly to the third round of Asian Cup qualification.
The remaining 4 teams entered the play-off round to contest the remaining two spots in the third round of Asian Cup qualification.
Play-off round: There was one round of home-and-away two-legged play-off matches that determined the final two qualifiers for the third round.
Third round: The 24 teams will be divided into six groups of four to play single round-robin matches in six centralised venues, and they will compete for the remaining slots of the Asian Cup.

Entrants
The 46 FIFA-affiliated nations from the AFC entered qualification, with the April 2019 FIFA Men's World Rankings used to determine which nations would compete in the first round and which nations would receive a bye through to the second round. For seeding in the second round and third round draws, the most recent FIFA Rankings prior to those draws have been expected to be used.

Due to the joint format of the World Cup and Asian Cup qualifiers, both Qatar (as the host nation of the 2022 World Cup) and China (as the former host nation of the 2023 Asian Cup) entered the second round of Asian Cup qualifiers.

The following restrictions were applied:
 Northern Mariana Islands, which is not a FIFA member, could not enter.
 Timor-Leste was barred from participating in the Asian Cup qualification after being found to have fielded a total of 12 ineligible players in 2019 AFC Asian Cup qualification matches, among other competitions. However, as FIFA did not bar Timor-Leste from the World Cup qualifiers,  the country was allowed to enter the competition, but was ineligible to qualify for the Asian Cup.

Schedule
The schedule of the competition is expected to be as follows in the tables below.

On 9 March 2020, FIFA and AFC announced that the second round matches on matchdays 7–10 due to take place in March and June 2020 were postponed to later dates due to the COVID-19 pandemic, with the new dates to be confirmed. However, subject to approval by FIFA and AFC, and agreement of both member associations, the matches may be played as scheduled provided that the safety of all individuals involved meets the required standards. On 5 June, AFC confirmed that matchdays 7 and 8 were scheduled to take place on 8 and 13 October respectively while matchdays 9 and 10 were also scheduled to kick off on 12 and 17 November. On 12 August, AFC announced that the upcoming qualifying matches for the 2022 World Cup and 2023 Asian Cup, originally scheduled to take place during the international match windows in October and November 2020, were rescheduled to 2021.

On 11 November 2020, the AFC Competitions Committee agreed at its meeting that all remaining second round matches were to be completed by 15 June 2021 with matchdays 7 and 8 in March, and matchdays 9 and 10 in June. However, on the same day, FIFA, along with the Bangladeshi and Qatari member associations, gave approval to the only second round match originally scheduled for 2020, Qatar v. Bangladesh, which was played on 4 December.

On 19 February 2021, FIFA and AFC postponed the majority of the upcoming matches to June. On 20 October, the AFC reported that the third round will begin in June 2022 with the final round draw to be held earlier in February.

First round 

The draw for the first round took place on 17 April 2019 at 11:00 MST (UTC+8), at the AFC House in Kuala Lumpur, Malaysia.

The six teams eliminated from this round progressed to the cancelled 2020 AFC Solidarity Cup.

Second round

The draw for the second round was held on 17 July 2019 at 17:00 MST (UTC+8), at AFC House in Kuala Lumpur, Malaysia.

Groups

Group A

Group B

Group C

Group D

Group E

Group F

Group G

Group H
North Korea withdrew from the qualifying round due to safety concerns related to the COVID-19 pandemic, therefore the results of their matches were excluded from the group standings.

Ranking of runner-up teams
Group H contained only four teams compared to five teams in all other groups after North Korea withdrew from the competition. Therefore, the results against the fifth-placed team were not counted when determining the ranking of the runner-up teams.

Ranking of fifth-placed teams

Play-off round

Four teams competed in a single round for two slots to the Third Round. It was planned to have a total of eight slots for the third round be available from this round (four from round 1, four from round 2) and the four teams that were to be eliminated from this stage would have progressed to the later cancelled 2020 AFC Solidarity Cup.

Third round

A total of 24 teams competed in the third round of AFC Asian Cup qualifiers. Since the then-2023 hosts China advanced to the 2022 FIFA World Cup qualifying third round, the automatic slot for the hosts was no longer necessary, and a total of 11 slots for the Asian Cup were available from this round.

Groups

Group A

Group B

Group C

Group D

Group E

Group F

Ranking of runner-up teams

Qualified teams

The following 24 teams qualified for the final tournament.

Notes

Top goalscorers

Below is full goalscorers lists for all rounds:

First round
Second round
Play-off round
Third round

See also
2022 FIFA World Cup qualification (AFC)

Notes

References

External links
, the-AFC.com
Preliminary Joint Qualification 2022, stats.the-AFC.com

 
Qualification
2023
2019 in Asian football
2020 in Asian football
2021 in Asian football
2022 in Asian football
AFC Asian Cup